Sameen Kandanearachchi (born 24 March 1988) is a Sri Lankan cricketer. He made his first-class debut for Sri Lanka Air Force Sports Club in Tier B of the 2008–09 Premier League Tournament on 14 November 2008.

References

External links
 

1988 births
Living people
Sri Lankan cricketers
Bloomfield Cricket and Athletic Club cricketers
Chilaw Marians Cricket Club cricketers
Colombo Cricket Club cricketers
Sri Lanka Air Force Sports Club cricketers
Cricketers from Colombo